Donal O'Shea is a Canadian mathematician, who is also noted for his bestselling books. He served as the fifth president of New College of Florida in Sarasota, from July 1, 2012, until June 30, 2021. He was succeeded by Patricia Okker on July 1, 2021.  Before coming to New College, he served in various roles at Mount Holyoke College, including professor of mathematics, dean of faculty, and vice president for academic affairs.  

O'Shea graduated with a B.Sc. from Harvard College, and received a Ph.D. in mathematics from Queen's University in Kingston, Ontario in 1981; his thesis, titled On μ-Equivalent Families of Singularities, was written under the direction of Albert John Coleman.

Bibliography
Some of his best known books are:
 The Poincaré Conjecture: In Search of the Shape of the Universe 

The book has consistently received good reviews.
 David A. Cox, John Little, and Donal O'Shea: Using algebraic geometry, Graduate Texts in Mathematics, vol. 185, Springer-Verlag, 2005. 
 David A. Cox, John Little, and Donal O'Shea: Ideals, varieties, and algorithms: an introduction to computational algebraic geometry and commutative algebra, 3rd. edition, Springer Verlag, 2007.

References

External links
 http://www.encyclopedia.com/arts/educational-magazines/oshea-donal-donal-b-oshea
 

Year of birth missing (living people)
Living people
20th-century Canadian mathematicians
Mount Holyoke College faculty
Harvard University alumni
Presidents of New College of Florida
Queen's University at Kingston alumni
Algebraic geometers
21st-century Canadian  mathematicians